Sam Perry (born 18 September 1989) is an Australian singer and looping artist best known for winning the seventh series of The Voice Australia in 2018.

Career

2013–2017
In early 2013 Perry was scouted for Onyx Productions' live theatre stunt show 360 Allstars – Urban Circus. The show toured Australia with over 76 performances before continuing its success in Germany with a near-sold out 25-show tour.

In February 2014, Perry premièred a non-stop vocal soundscape titled The World Is.. at the Perth Fringeworld Festival. The show was awarded a four-star review from The West Australian and the Fringeworld Music Award of 2014.

In 2017, Perry performed at the Fringe Festival for the fourth consecutive year.

2018: The Voice

In 2018, Perry took part in the seventh season of The Voice Australia, where he auditioned with "When Doves Cry" and joined Kelly Rowland's team. His audition sparked controversy throughout the competition, with some viewers and judge Boy George questioning whether his sample-based approach complies with essentially a singing competition. Perry progressed through the various stages to the final and was announced the winner on 17 June 2018. His debut single on Universal Records titled "Trust Myself" was released immediately after the show.

 denotes winner.
 denotes a song that reached the top 10 on iTunes.

In August 2018, Perry announced details for a 9-date national tour commencing in Melbourne on 16 November 2018. Perry said "My new music is coming together well, I have a lot to do and more to learn, but it's exciting. I can't wait to tour Australia and show everyone what I have been working on."

In November 2018, Perry released "Looking for Light", a song created in collaboration with Melbourne music dynamo Dub FX and lyrically pokes at our obsession with image and what others think of us.

Discography

Singles

As a featured artist

References

External links
 
 
 
 Sam Perry on Vkontakte

Living people
1990 births
Australian pop singers
The Voice (Australian TV series) contestants
The Voice (franchise) winners
21st-century Australian singers